The 2019 Michelin Pilot Challenge is the twentieth season of the IMSA SportsCar Challenge and the sixth season organized by the International Motor Sports Association (IMSA). Michelin is set to become the new official tire supplier of the series, following the departure of Continental Tire at the end of 2018.

Classes

 Grand Sport (GS) (run to FIA GT4 regulations)
 Touring Car (TCR)

The Street Tuner (ST) class will not return to the renamed series after the 2018 season.

Rule Changes
It was announced during the 2018 Petit Le Mans livestream that floor-mounted shifting would be dropped for the 2019 season.

Series News
Multimatic will be using IMSA GTO tribute liveries in commemoration of IMSA's 50th anniversary.

Schedule

Race Schedule
The 2019 schedule was released on 3 August 2018 and features twelve rounds.

Entry list

Grand Sport

Touring Car

Notes

Race results
Bold indicates overall winner.

Championship standings

Points systems
Championship points are awarded in each class at the finish of each event. Points are awarded based on finishing positions as shown in the chart below.

Team points
Team points are calculated in exactly the same way as driver points, using the point distribution chart. Each car entered is considered its own "team" regardless if it is a single entry or part of a two-car team.

Teams' Championships

Standings: Grand Sport

Standings: Touring Car

Manufacturers' Championships

Standings: Grand Sport

Standings: Touring Car

References

External links
 Official website

Michelin Pilot Challenge
Michelin Pilot Challenge
Michelin Pilot Challenge